This is a list of sounds associated with the Canadian Island of Newfoundland.

Songs with an unknown composer/lyricist ("Traditional")

"A Great Big Sea Hove In Long Beach"
"Bake Apple Time in Newfoundland"
"Ballad of the Southern Cross"
"Billy Peddle"
"Doin' the Newfie Stomp"
"Feller from Fortune"
"Ferryland Sealer"
"Fishin' in a Dory"
"Good Ol' Newfie Music"
"Granny's Drawehrs"
"Harbour LeCou"
"Heave Away"
"Heaven by Sea" Simani
"Hip Rubber Gang"
"I'm a Newfie by George"
"I's The B'y"
"Jack Hinks"
"Jack Was Every Inch A Sailor"
"Jolly Roving Tar"
"Last Shanty"
"Lukey's Boat"
"Missing Home Today"
"Music and Friends" Simani
"Mussels in the Corner"
"Newfoundland Party"
"The North Atlantic Squadron"
"Now I'm 64"
"Oh No, Not I"
"Old Polina"
"Piece of Baloney"
"Rubber Boots Song"
"Sally Brown"
"Saltwater Cowboys" Simani
"Squid Jigging Ground" Art Scammell
"She's Like the Swallow"
"Star of Logy Bay"
"Sweet Forget-Me-Not"
"Tickle Cove Pond" Mark Walker
"The Rattlin' Bog"
"The Tiny Red Light- Harry Hibbs
"Tishialuk Girls"
"The Wedding in Renews"
"Vive la rose" from Emile Benoit
"Fishin' In a Dory"

Songs with a known composer/lyricist

"The Anti-Confederate Song" (Come near at your peril, Canadian wolf) - J. W. McGrath
"Aunt Martha's Sheep" - Dick Nolan and Ellis Coles
"The Badger Drive" - John V. Devine
"The Banks of Newfoundland" - Francis Forbes
"The Cliffs of Baccalieu" - Jack Withers
"The CN Bus" - Tom Cahill
"Cod Liver Oil" - Johnny Burke
"Come Closer East Coaster" - Eddie Coffey
"Concerning Charlie Horse" - Omar Blondahl
"Daddy's Songs" - performed by Susan Lawrence/written by Gus Burton
"Excursion Around The Bay" - Johnny Burke
"The Government Game" - Al Pittman
"Grey Foggy Day" - Eddie Coffey
"Hard, Hard Times" - additional lyrics by William James Emberley
"The Islander" - Bruce Moss
"Kelligrews Soiree" - Johnny Burke
"Let Me Fish Off Cape St. Mary's" - Otto P. Kelland
"Lost Ties" - performed and written by Susan Lawrence
"Merasheen Farewell" - Ernie Wilson
"More Than St. John's" - Rusty Reid
"Never Been There Before" - Johnny Burke
"The Night Paddy Murphy Died" - Johnny Burke
"No More Fish, No Fishermen" - Shelley Posen
"Old Brown's Daughter" - Johnny Burke
"Ode to Newfoundland" - Words by Cavendish Boyle, music by Hubert Parry
"Out from St. Leonard's" - Gary O'Driscoll
"Pat Murphy's Meadow" - John V. Devine
"Petty Harbour Bait Skiff" - John Grace
"The Liquor Continues to Flow" - performed by Susan Lawrence/written by Gus Burton
"Recruiting Sergeant" - Great Big Sea
"The Rocks of Merasheen" - Words by Al Pittman, music by Joe Byrne
"The Ryans and The Pittmans (We'll Rant and We'll Roar)" - traditional, additional lyrics by W.H. LeMessurier
"Saltwater Joys" - Wayne Chaulk performed by Buddy Wasisname and the Other Fellers
"Song for Newfoundland" - Buddy Wasisname and the Other Fellers
"Sonny's Dream" - Ron Hynes
"Squid-Jiggin' Ground" - A. R. Scammell
"Tickle Cove Pond" - Mark Walker
"Towards the Sunset" - Pat and Joe Byrne
"The Trinity Cake" - Johnny Burke
"Up She Rises" - Bob Porter
"West-Country Lady" - Dermot O'Reilly
"Wave Over Wave" - Jim Payne and Fergus O'Byrne
"The Northern Lights of Labrador" - Don Fulford (songwriter)
"With me long rubbers on" - The Bay Boys
"Mist" - Protest The Hero

Lists of songs
Canadian music-related lists